The list of ship launches in 1703 includes a chronological list of some ships launched in 1703.


References

1703
Ship launches